Bowerstown is an unincorporated community in Union Township, Huntington County, Indiana.

History
Samuel H. Bowers started a feed mill and repair shop in Bowerstown ca. 1909.

References

Unincorporated communities in Huntington County, Indiana
Unincorporated communities in Indiana